Francisca Güemes (1779-1871) was an Argentine heroine. A sister of Martín Miguel de Güemes, she, alongside her sister Macacha Güemes, is counted as a heroine of the Argentine War of Independence for her participation in the Gaucha War during the war of independence.

References 
  Sosa de Newton, Lily (1980). Diccionario Biografico de Mujeres Argentinas. Buenos Aires: Plus Ultra. .

1779 births
1871 deaths
Argentine rebels
19th-century Argentine people
People of the Argentine War of Independence
Women in 19th-century warfare
Place of birth missing
Place of death missing
19th-century rebels
Women in war in South America